Glomfjord is a village in the municipality of Meløy in Nordland county, Norway. The industrial community is located along Norwegian County Road 17 at the head of the Glomfjorden, just north of the Arctic Circle.

In 2020 Fykantrappa - a popular outdoor stairway, was permanently closed after being in operation since 1919.

Heavy industry
The village is based around the Glomfjord hydroelectric power plant, which was the target of the 1942 commando raid entitled Operation Musketoon. Norsk Hydro began construction for fertilizer production here in 1912, with power production starting in 1920. The facilities were bought by the state in 1918, but leased to Hydro in 1947 (now the fertilizer division is known as Yara International). Today a conglomerate of industries are found in Glomfjord Industry Park. The Forså and Sundsfjord hydroelectric power stations were also built to supply power to industry in Glomfjord in 1963.

Climate
Although located north of the Arctic Circle and not far from Norway's second largest glacier Svartisen, the climate is well suited for living due to the Gulf Stream, albeit rather wet. The temperature is seldom below  during winter time. During summer time the sun does not set. The midnight sun also makes the plants grow faster.

Older climate normal

Tourism
Glomfjord two hotel’s, a bistro, a WaterLand (with two slides and two pools) a movie theater and some beautiful mountains for skiing and snowboarding in the winter.  There are tours with fishing, climbing, and other relaxing activities in the mountains during summer. Svartisen and the lake Storglomvatnet are tourist destinations that are near Glomfjord as well.

References

Meløy
Villages in Nordland
Populated places of Arctic Norway